Davenport Municipal Airport  is a general aviation airport located about  north of downtown Davenport, a city in Scott County, Iowa, United States. The airport, which dates back to 1948, has been home to the Quad City Air Show since 1987.

The fixed-base operation is run by Carver Aero Inc. The airport has two runways (3-21 and 15-33) and a  hangar.  Most of the air traffic in and out of Davenport Municipal is regional (commercial flights in the area are generally handled by Quad City International Airport), consisting mainly of single-engine prop and twin-engine prop aircraft.  However, some smaller private jets also utilize the airport for longer trips to other destinations around the United States.  The National Oceanic and Atmospheric Administration operates the Quad Cities National Weather Service office from Davenport Municipal Airport. Also the U.S. Army Iowa National Guard 1/109th Aviation Battalion Maintains an Armory with three-four CH-47F Chinook and two Eurocopter UH-72 Lakota  Helicopters.

Facilities and aircraft 

Runway 15 is equipped with an ILS system as well as MALSR lighting, and is the designated calm wind runway. All runways have RNAV approaches with medium to high intensity runway edge lighting with VASI glide slope indicators (GS 3.0 degrees) with left traffic patterns. Runways 3/21 have a VOR approach from the Davenport VORTAC (DVN, 113.8) (located off-field).  

For the 12-month period ending August 15, 2016, the airport had 28,251 aircraft operations, an average of 77 per day: 94% general aviation, 4% air taxi and 2% military. In June 2017, there were 119 aircraft based at this airport: 91 single-engine, 13 multi-engine, 3 jet and 12 military.

In January 2011 a new  terminal with an attached  hangar was opened.  It was constructed by Carver Aero for a cost of $3 million. In addition to Carver's operations the facility includes a pilots’ lounge, a flight planning room, a business center and conference rooms. The airport's old 1950's era terminal was torn down as part of this construction project.

In 2012, the airport received a $63,000 grant from the U.S. Department of Transportation for an environmental impact study.

The local fixed-base operator Carver Aero offers flight charter, aircraft rental, and flight training, as well as line and maintenance services. Their nine-aircraft fleet consists of one Cessna Citation V, one King Air 350, one King Air 200, one Cessna 172P, and five Piper PA-28s (two Warriors, two 140s, and one Archer). 

The airport also has an Automated Surface Observation System (ASOS) on channel 120.175. The airport's combined CTAF and UNICOM is on channel 123.00. The facility is usually staffed from 06:30 to dusk. There is a 24/7 self-serve fuel pump on-site with 100LL.

Quad City Air Show 

The Quad City Air Show is hosted at the Davenport Municipal Airport, and started in 1987. It is one of the longest continuous running airshows, and the largest in the state of Iowa. The show has hosted all of the North American military demonstration teams and several international performers.

References

External links 
 Davenport Municipal Airport page at City of Davenport website
Quad City Air Show

Airports in Iowa
Airports established in 1948
Transportation in Davenport, Iowa
Transportation in the Quad Cities
Buildings and structures in Davenport, Iowa
Transportation buildings and structures in Scott County, Iowa